John Robert Bruce Crawford (10 October 1938 – June 2022) was an English footballer who played as a wing half in the Football League for Blackpool and Tranmere Rovers. He later briefly played for Fleetwood FC in the Lancashire Combination. He also made one appearance for England U 23s against Scotland in February 1962. Crawford died in June 2022, at the age of 83.

References

1938 births
2022 deaths
English footballers
Tranmere Rovers F.C. players
Blackpool F.C. players
Fleetwood Town F.C. players
Association football wing halves
England under-23 international footballers
English Football League players
Footballers from Preston, Lancashire